Bergeijk is a municipality and town in the southern Netherlands, in the province of North Brabant. It is one of 21 municipalities, including Eindhoven, that make up the Eindhoven Region Cooperative (Samenwerkingsverband Regio Eindhoven).

The spoken language is Kempenlands (an East Brabantian dialect, which is very similar to colloquial Dutch).

Bergeijk is traditionally an agricultural area, but tourism and recreation are steadily gaining importance. Among the facilities in the municipality of Bergeijk is a bungalow park in the village Westerhoven.

Bergeijk is known in the Netherlands as a Rietveld village, for its architecture by De Stijl architect Gerrit Rietveld, and for a program on national radio: Radio Bergeijk, a parody on local radio.

Population centres

Topography

Topographic map of the municipality of Bergeijk, June 2015.

Notable people 

 Henk van Gerven (born 1955 in Riethoven) a Dutch politician and general practitioner
 Wilbert Das (born 1963) a Dutch fashion designer, grew up in Riethoven

Sport 
 Harm van Veldhoven (born 1962 in Luyksgestel) a Dutch-Belgian football manager
 Kees Koolen (born 1965 in Bergeijk) a Dutch rally raid racer and businessman
 Tommie van der Leegte (born 1977 in Bergeijk) a retired Dutch footballer with 334 club caps
 Rudi van Houts (born 1984 in Luyksgestel) a Dutch road cyclist and mountain biker, competed in the 2008 and 2012 Summer Olympics
 Harrie Lavreysen (born 1997 in Luyksgestel) double Olympic champion in track cycling at the 2021 Summer Olympics in Tokyo

Gallery

References

External links 

Official website

 
Municipalities of North Brabant
Populated places in North Brabant